Brad Moran (born March 20, 1979) is a Canadian former professional ice hockey centre, his last team being the Nottingham Panthers of the Elite Ice Hockey League (EIHL).

Playing career 
A graduate of the Western Hockey League (WHL)'s Calgary Hitmen, Moran, who was originally drafted in the 7th round, 191st overall by the Buffalo Sabres in the 1998 NHL Entry Draft, spent five seasons with the Hitmen before signing as a free agent with the Columbus Blue Jackets in the summer of 2000.

As a prolific scorer with the Hitmen, he recorded 532 regular season and playoff points over his five-year WHL career, earning WHL Player of the Year honours and capturing the Bob Clarke Trophy as the league's top scorer in 1999–2000 while being named to the WHL Eastern Conference First All-Star Team. He later had his number retired with the Calgary Hitmen with his #20 hanging in the rafters of the Scotiabank Saddledome.

Moran spent the majority of his first four seasons of professional hockey with the Blue Jackets' AHL affiliate in Syracuse while seeing limited action the parent club in Columbus.

In June 2006, he signed with the Vancouver Canucks as a free agent. After two seasons primarily leading the Canucks' AHL affiliate, the Manitoba Moose, Moran signed for Swedish team Skelleftea AIK prior to the 2008–09 season, becoming the highest paid player on the team.

On July 7, 2010, it was announced that Moran had returned to North America, signing as a free agent with the Edmonton Oilers to a one-year contract.

On April 25, 2011, Moran signed a two-year contract with Vaxjo Lakers of the Elitserien (SEL).

On January 29, 2013 Moran signed a contract for the remainder of the 2012–13 season with SaiPa of the Finnish SM-liiga.

On April 17, 2013 he signed a contract with EHC Black Wings Linz of the Austrian Erste Bank Eishockey Liga for the 2013–14 season. After scoring at a point per game pace with 51 points in 50 games with the Black Wings, Moran was re-signed to a one-year contract to remain in Linz.

Having left the Black Wings after two seasons, Moran continued his career abroad, in agreeing to a one-year contract with English club, the Nottingham Panthers of the EIHL on August 14, 2015. Moran announced his retirement after two seasons with the Panthers, the second as club captain, in April 2017.

In November, 2018, Moran was named Head Coach of the Calgary Canucks

Records

Calgary Hitmen 
Calgary Hitmen franchise record for assists in a season (72)
Calgary Hitmen franchise record for career games played (357)
Calgary Hitmen franchise record for career points (450)
Calgary Hitmen franchise record for career goals (204)
Calgary Hitmen franchise record for career assists (246)

Syracuse Crunch 
Syracuse Crunch franchise record for career powerplay goals (38)

Career statistics

Awards 
1999 — CHL Third All-Star Team
1999 — WHL East First All-Star Team
1999 — WHL airBC Trophy
2000 — CHL Second All-Star Team
2000 — WHL Bob Clarke Trophy
2000 — WHL East First All-Star Team
2000 — WHL Four Broncos Memorial Trophy

References

External links 

1979 births
Living people
EHC Black Wings Linz players
EHC Visp players
Buffalo Sabres draft picks
Calgary Hitmen players
Canadian ice hockey centres
Columbus Blue Jackets players
Ice hockey people from British Columbia
Manitoba Moose players
Nottingham Panthers players
Oklahoma City Barons players
SaiPa players
SCL Tigers players
Sportspeople from Abbotsford, British Columbia
Skellefteå AIK players
Syracuse Crunch players
Vancouver Canucks players
Växjö Lakers players
Canadian expatriate ice hockey players in England
Canadian expatriate ice hockey players in Austria
Canadian expatriate ice hockey players in Sweden